Brian Michael Salcido (born April 14, 1985) is an American former professional ice hockey player. He was the 23rd California-born NHL hockey player and first born and developed player from southern California to play for the Anaheim Ducks.

Playing career
Salcido was born in Los Angeles, California. As a youth, he played in the 1999 Quebec International Pee-Wee Hockey Tournament with the Los Angeles Junior Kings minor ice hockey team. He later  moved to Minnesota to play for Shattuck-Saint Mary's high school, noted for its midget AAA hockey program. From 2003 until 2006 Salcido attended Colorado College and was a member of the varsity ice hockey squad. Salcido was drafted by the Ducks in the fifth round, 141st overall of the 2005 NHL Entry Draft.

On August 2, 2006, Salcido signed with Anaheim on a three-year entry level contract, he was assigned to the Portland Pirates of the American Hockey League. On February 20, 2009, he made his NHL debut with the Anaheim Ducks against the Detroit Red Wings. He signed a one year contract with the Ducks on July 6, 2009.

On May 13, 2013 Salcido signed with HC Amur Khabarovsk of the Kontinental Hockey League. After 23 games with Khabarovsk and unable to attain a regular defensive role, Salcido returned to the Liiga with JYP Jyväskylä.

On July 24, 2014, Salcido transferred from JYP to return to SaiPa as a free agent on a one-year deal. In the 2014–15 season, Salcido enjoyed his best season in the Finnish Liiga, contributing with 12 goals and 35 points in 59 games from the blueline with SaiPa leading the league in scoring for a defenseman.

Salcido left Finland as a free agent at seasons end, agreeing to a two-year contract with German club, ERC Ingolstadt of the Deutsche Eishockey Liga on May 20, 2015. In the second year of his contract in the 2016–17 season, Salcido appeared in 52 games for 22 points before suffering a preliminary playoff loss to the Fischtown Pinguins to conclude his tenure with ERC.

Career statistics

Awards and honors

References

External links

1985 births
Amur Khabarovsk players
Anaheim Ducks draft picks
Anaheim Ducks players
Colorado College Tigers men's ice hockey players
Ice hockey people from Los Angeles
ERC Ingolstadt players
Iowa Stars players
JYP Jyväskylä players
Living people
Manitoba Moose players
Portland Pirates players
SaiPa players
HC Sparta Praha players
Tingsryds AIF players
American men's ice hockey defensemen